H.E.R. is a compilation album by American singer H.E.R., released on October 20, 2017, by RCA Records. The album comprises songs from the singer's EPs H.E.R., Vol. 1 (2016) and H.E.R., Vol. 2 (2017), and includes six additional songs. The album won Best R&B Album and received four other nominations at the 61st Grammy Awards, including Album of the Year and Best New Artist for H.E.R.

Gabi Wilson signed a recording contract with RCA Records at age 14 after performing covers of Alicia Keys songs on the television shows Maury, Today and The View. Her first EP, H.E.R., Vol. 1, was released on September 9, 2016, and peaked at number 28 on Billboards Top R&B/Hip-Hop Albums chart. A second EP, H.E.R., Vol. 2, was released on June 16, 2017. It peaked at number 49 on the all-genre Billboard 200 and number 22 on Top R&B/Hip-Hop Albums. According to Billboard figures, the compilation spent 181 weeks on the Billboard 200, making it the longest-charting compilation album by a female artist in the history of the chart, surpassing previous record holder Madonna, whose 1990 compilation, The Immaculate Collection, spent 148 weeks on the chart. On the subsequent Top R&B/Hip-Hop Albums chart, the album spent 66 weeks on the chart. On the Top R&B Albums chart, it spent 208 weeks.

The compilation H.E.R., released on October 20, 2017, includes the songs from the two prior EPs along with six new tracks, including the duet "Best Part" from Daniel Caesar's album Freudian (2017). The six new songs were also released on a third EP, H.E.R., Vol. 2: The B-Sides, on October 20, 2017. This EP peaked at number 139 on the Billboard 200.

Awards
It won the Album/Mixtape of the Year at the 2018 Soul Train Music Awards. The album won Best R&B Album, as well as Best R&B Performance for the song "Best Part" with Daniel Caesar at the 61st Grammy Awards and also received a nomination for Album of the Year.

Commercial performance
H.E.R. peaked at number 23 on the US Billboard 200 and number 14 on the US Top R&B/Hip-Hop Albums chart. On January 16, 2020, the album was certified platinum by the Recording Industry Association of America (RIAA) for combined sales and album-equivalent units of over a million units in the United States.

Track listing
Credits adapted from Spotify.

Charts

Weekly charts

Year-end charts

Certifications

References

2017 compilation albums
H.E.R. albums
Albums produced by MNEK
Contemporary R&B compilation albums
Grammy Award for Best R&B Album
RCA Records compilation albums